"Still Got Time" is a song by English singer and songwriter Zayn featuring Canadian rapper and singer PartyNextDoor. It was released on 24 March 2017 by RCA Records, and it appears on the Japanese edition and the 2020 digital re-release of Zayn's second studio album Icarus Falls (2018). The song was announced on social media. Zayn reportedly wrote this song for his sister, Waliyah.

Composition
The song, produced by Murda Beatz and Frank Dukes, has been described by The Fader as "dancehall-inspired pop music with slow, tropical beat" and by Entertainment.ie as "a smooth, finger-clicking slice of AutoTuned r'n'b."

Critical reception
Writing for Billboard, Taylor Weather said: "[Malik's] latest song is a hopeful (and seriously catchy) anthem for the girls who aren't quite as lucky as Hadid."  He also noted its "groovy electronic, guitar-plucked beat" Quinn Moreland, assistant editor at Pitchfork compared "Still Got Time" to Drake's "Passionfruit" due to its 'tropical-house inspired production'. She also commented that Zayn 'even sounds like he's having a good time.' Jordan Sargent from SPIN also praised the singer's vocals, commenting that while "purring over a typically great, abstract guitar loop, Zayn sounded relaxed and at ease trying to convince a girl that she's too young to be worried about love".

Music video
The music video premiered on 21 April 2017 via Zayn's Vevo account. Directed by Calmatic, the video is shot through a VHS filter and follows Zayn at a house party surrounded by people skating down the stairs, smoking and pole dancing. The video concludes with Zayn noticing an alligator walking past his paddling pool and then a small monkey on his shoulder.

Track listing

Charts

Certifications

References

2017 singles
2017 songs
Music videos directed by Calmatic
PartyNextDoor songs
RCA Records singles
Song recordings produced by Frank Dukes
Song recordings produced by Murda Beatz
Songs written by Frank Dukes
Songs written by Murda Beatz
Songs written by PartyNextDoor
Songs written by Zayn Malik
Zayn Malik songs